Hervé Djamel Loiseau (21 March 1973 – December 2001) was a French soldier who attended Afghan training camps, and was found  dead of hunger and cold in the aftermath of the Battle of Tora Bora in December 2001, the first confirmation that Frenchmen had joined the ranks of Osama bin Laden in the wake of the 11 September 2001 attacks.

Life
He had accompanied Brahim Yadel to Lahore, Pakistan, on 11 March 2000, when the pair crossed the border into Afghanistan after the urging of recruiter Karim Bourti.

He also maintained contact with the Algerian Meroine Berrahal.

Legacy
Five years after his death, an independent French film entitled Djamel Loiseau: Journey of a Soldier of Allah was produced by Ranwa Stephan.

References

French Muslims
Converts to Islam
1973 births
2001 deaths
French military personnel killed in action
Deaths by starvation
Deaths from hypothermia